Gilad Janklowicz (born July 27, 1954) is an Israeli-born fitness personality best known for the longest running fitness show in the United States, Bodies in Motion, and for his show Total Body Sculpt with Gilad.

Raised in Israel, Janklowicz has been an athlete devoted to fitness since his high school days. He became a renowned Olympic hopeful in the decathlon, and a fitness instructor in the Israeli military. Janklowicz later moved to Los Angeles to attend the UCLA film school. In Los Angeles he built up a following as a fitness instructor. Janklowicz is the creator of more than 30 workout video titles. He has also been featured in many print publications.

Bodies in Motion is a half-hour aerobic workout show that launched in 1983. It was the first fitness show to air on ESPN, where it aired from 1985 to 1996. Most recently, it aired on Discovery Fit and Health. Gilad also hosted a game show where contestants had to guess by looking at a monitor which Body in Motion cast member the muscles or six pack belonged to (after every round the contestants were shown less and less body so it got harder as the game progressed). This show was called 'Gilad's Minds In Motion' and it aired on the History Channel 2.5 Network from 1999 to 2002. "Total Body Sculpt with Gilad" is a half-hour sculpting workout show. From 2004 to 2010 the series ran on FitTV until Discovery put their health and fitness channels together. It's currently seen on JLTV Jewish Life Television. In April 2020 the show also started airing again on Vice on TV in the Netherlands, presumably to compensate for a lack of exercise due to the partial lockdown measures against the COVID-19 pandemic.

In March 2007 Janklowicz was inducted into the National Fitness Hall of Fame. In September 2007 he released 3 new fitness DVDs from his Total Body Sculpt Series as seen on FiTV. In January 2008 Gilad's Express Workouts was released.

References

External links

Living people
1954 births
Israeli television presenters
Jewish sportspeople
Aerobic exercise
Exercise instructors